is a 1991 vertical-scrolling shooter video game developed and published by Hudson Soft in Japan. It is the third game in the main Star Soldier series, and has been released in Europe for the Wii Virtual Console on May 2, 2008 and in North America on September 8, 2008. It was subsequently released for the Wii U Virtual Console in Japan in 2014 and North America in 2017.

Gameplay
This game features 7 stages to play as well as a 2-minute and 5-minute challenge mode. Unlike the other PC-Engine Star Soldier games, the player chooses at the beginning of the game the exact kind of weapon each color power-up grants.

Notes

References

1991 video games
Star Soldier
Now Production games
Scrolling shooters
TurboGrafx-16 games
Video games developed in Japan
Virtual Console games
Virtual Console games for Wii U
Single-player video games